Live in Montreal is the second live album by the Canadian melodic death metal band Quo Vadis. It was released on May 12, 2007.

Track listing

Disc One
 "Quo Vadis Homine" – 1:30
 "Silence Calls the Storm" – 4:58
 "In Contempt" – 4:13
 "Absolution" – 5:28
 "Pantheon of Tears" – 3:48
 "To the Bitter End" – 6:41
 "Carpae Deum" – 3:15
 "Mute Requiem" – 4:46

Disc Two
 "In Articulo Mortis" – 1:16
 "Fate's Descent" – 4:35
 "Vital Signs" – 2:20
 "On the Shores of Ithaka" – 8:08
 "Tunnel Effect" – 7:07
 "Inner Capsule" – 7:09
 "Dead Man's Diary" – 6:16
 "Ego Intuo Et Servo Te" – 2:13
 "Legions of the Betrayed" – 5:58
 "Break the Cycle" – 7:07

Quo Vadis (band) albums
2007 live albums